Paul Douglass Gilger (born October 13, 1954 in Mansfield, Ohio) is an architect, set designer, and playwright.

Playwrighting
Gilger conceived the 2003 off-Broadway Jerry Herman musical revue Showtune.

Architecture
In 1991, Gilger was the project designer for the Industrial Light and Magic Film Studio in San Rafael, California for filmmaker George Lucas (Star Wars, Indiana Jones) and in 1989, he helped prepare conceptual designs for the Disney/MGM Film Studios in Tokyo, Japan.

Gilger's architectural work includes:
 "Edgewater", a residence in Mill Valley in Marin County, California, built in 2003 by Lehman Brothers of New York
 the conversion of the 1894 Del Monte Cannery Building in Santa Rosa, California into the 6th Street Playhouse in 2005
 "Park Lane Village Square", a $100 million residential/commercial mixed-use project in Santa Rosa, completed in 2009
 the Cloverdale Performing Arts Center for the city of Cloverdale, California in 2010
 facility designer for the Safari West Wildlife Animal Preserve in Sonoma County, California since 2011.

Gilger has been a Senior Project Designer with Hedgpeth Architects in Santa Rosa, California, for over 30 years.

Set design
With Nomad Productions Scenic Studios in San Francisco, Gilger worked on concert touring sets for Madonna (1985 Like a Virgin Tour), Kenny Loggins, Crosby Stills & Nash, Carlos Santana, Alabama, Dio, and Petra, stage sets for Whoopi Goldberg and Anthony Newley (the 1983 musical Chaplin), set pieces for the Super Bowl broadcast, and numerous sets for television. He has designed numerous stage sets for theatre companies in Ohio and California, and from 1975 thru 1981 was the set designer and associate producer of the Miss Ohio Pageant.

Lincoln Highway
Gilger is the chair of the Lincoln Highway Association National Mapping Committee.  In 2012, Gilger completed the cartography of the entire Lincoln Highway, creating the online Official Map of the Lincoln Highway, a 20-year project involving research by 25 members of the committee. Additionally, Gilger serves as the head tour guide for the Lincoln Highway Association.

In popular culture
Gilger's name is used for one of the characters in the popular Japanese manga series Bleach created by Tite Kubo, who named most of the Espada characters after architects. The character "Nnoitra Gilga" is named after Richard Neutra and Paul Gilger.

Background & education
Gilger is a 1978 graduate of the University of Cincinnati College of Design, Architecture, Art, and Planning, with study in theatrical set design at University of Cincinnati College-Conservatory of Music.

His sister, Joan Gilger Stear, was Miss Ohio 1978.

Gilger resides in Santa Rosa, California.

External links
Article about Gilger and Lincoln Highway in San Francisco Chronicle
Article about Gilger in University of Cincinnati Magazine
Article about Gilger at Real Live Theater website
Article about the 6th Street Playhouse at Real Live Theater website

References and notes

1954 births
Living people
20th-century American architects
American production designers
People from Mansfield, Ohio
21st-century American architects